Leonard Warburton Matters (26 June 1881 – 31 October 1951) was an Australian journalist who became a Labour Party politician in the United Kingdom.

He was born a British subject in Adelaide, Australia, and fought in the Second Boer War in South Africa. He worked as a journalist in Argentina, and was managing editor of the Buenos Aires Herald.

In 1926, Matters proposed in a magazine article that the notorious serial killer Jack the Ripper was an eminent doctor, whose son had died from syphilis caught from a prostitute. According to Matters, the doctor, given the pseudonym "Dr Stanley", committed the murders in revenge and then fled to Argentina. Matters claimed he had discovered an account of Stanley's deathbed confession in a South American newspaper. He expanded his ideas into a book, The Mystery of Jack the Ripper, in 1929. The book was marketed as a serious study, but it contains obvious factual errors and the documents it supposedly uses as references have never been found. True crime writer Edmund Pearson, who was Matters' contemporary, said scathingly, "The deathbed confession bears about the same relation to the facts of criminology as the exploits of Peter Rabbit and Jerry Muskrat do to zoology." Ripper expert and former policeman Donald Rumbelow thought the theory was "almost certainly invented", and Stephen Knight, who wrote Jack the Ripper: The Final Solution, thought it was "based on unsupported and palpably false statements". Nevertheless, The Mystery of Jack the Ripper was the first full-length book on the Ripper, and it inspired further fictional works such as the theatre play Murder Most Foul and the film Jack the Ripper.

In the 1929 general election, Matters was elected to the United Kingdom House of Commons as the Member of Parliament (MP) for Kennington in London. He held the seat for two years, until his defeat at the 1931 general election, and was unsuccessful when he stood again in 1935.

See also

 Muriel Matters

References

External links 

Image at Australian War Memorial

1881 births
1951 deaths
Australian military personnel of the Second Boer War
Labour Party (UK) MPs for English constituencies
UK MPs 1929–1931
Australian newspaper editors
Politicians from Adelaide
Writers from Adelaide
20th-century Australian journalists